List of ironclads of Russia built between 1863 and 1889 for the Imperial Russian Navy.

The initial date corresponds to the launched of the ship and then the decommissioned or end is briefly indicated. Some of these ships managed to provide a minor service in the Soviet Navy before being discarded.

Ironclads

Broadside armored frigates
 
  (1863) – sold in 1908 and discarded in the early 1950s
  (1864) – sold in 1908 and scrapped in the 1950s
  (1867) – sold for scrap in 1908
  (1864) – decommissioned in 1885 and sold for scrap in 1897
  (1865) – decommissioned in 1885 and sold for scrap in 1892

Monitors
 
  (1864) – sold as a barge in 1903 and scrapped in 1918
  (1864) – stricken in 1900 and scrapped around 1918
  (1864) – stricken in 1900 and lost during World War I
  (1864) – stricken in 1900 and scrapped around 1918
  (1864) – stricken in 1900 and scrapped around 1918
  (1864) – stricken in 1900, final destination unknown
  (1864) – stricken in 1900 and converted into a floating workshop in 1955
  (1864) – stricken in 1900 and scrapped around 1922
  (1864) – stricken in 1900 and scrapped after 1922
  (1864) – stricken in 1900 and scrapped around 1924

  (1864) – stricken and scrapped in 1959 
 
  (1867) – stricken in 1907 and scrapped in 1911–12
  (1867) – sank in the Gulf of Finland in 1893
 
  (1867) – stricken in 1907 and sank in 1912
  (1867) – stricken in 1909 and scrapped in 1912
 
  (1868) – stricken in 1907 and unknown ending
  (1868) – stricken in 1907 and unknown ending
  (1873) – stricken in 1903 and sold for scrap in 1911
  (1875) – stricken in 1903 and sold for scrap in 1911

Central battery frigate
  (1867) – struck from the Navy List in 1911

Ironclad turret ship
  (1872) – stricken in 1959 and subsequently scrapped

Barbette ironclads
 
  (1886) – stricken in 1907 and sunk as a target in 1912
  (1886) – stricken in 1907 and scrapped mid-1920s
  (1887) – disabled in 1919 and sold as scrap in 1922
  (1892) – decommissioned in 1920 and sold as scrap between 1930 and 1936
 
  (1887) – sold for scrapping in 1922
  (1889) – captured by the Japanese in 1905, during Russo-Japanese War

See also
 List of ironclads

Sources
Moiseev S. P. Spisok korabley russkogo parovogo i bronenosnogo flota (s 1861 po 1917 god). – Voyenizdat, Moskva, 1948. (List of the Ships of Russian Steam and Armoured Navy (from 1861 to 1917)).
Boyevye korabli russkogo flota 8.1914-10.1918 gody: Spravochnik / Ed. by Yu. V. Apalkov. – INTEK, St. Peterburg, 1996. (Warships of the Russian Navy in August 1914 – October 1918).
Burov V. N. Otechestvennoye voyennoye korablestroyenoye v tretyem stoletii svoyei istorii. – Sudostroyeniye, St. Peterburg, 1995. (Native Naval Shipbuilding in 3rd century of its history [i.e. in the 20th century])

Russia
Ironclads